Astrotischeria omissa is a moth of the family Tischeriidae. It was described by Annette Frances Braun in 1927. It is found in North America, including Arizona, California and New Mexico.

References

Moths described in 1927
Tischeriidae